Anthurium camposii is a species of plant in the genus Anthurium endemic to Ecuador.  Its natural habitat is subtropical or tropical moist montane forests. It is threatened by habitat loss.

References

Endemic flora of Ecuador
camposii
Data deficient plants
Taxonomy articles created by Polbot